Phoenix Raceway is a 1-mile, low-banked tri-oval race track located in Avondale, Arizona, near Phoenix. The motorsport track opened in 1964 and currently hosts two NASCAR race weekends annually including the final championship race since 2020. Phoenix Raceway has also hosted the CART, IndyCar Series, USAC and the WeatherTech SportsCar Championship. The raceway is currently owned and operated by NASCAR.

Phoenix Raceway is home to two annual NASCAR race weekends, one of 13 facilities on the NASCAR schedule to host more than one race weekend a year. It first joined the NASCAR Cup Series schedule in 1988 as a late season event, and in 2005 the track was given a spring date. The now-NASCAR Craftsman Truck Series was added in 1995 and the now-NASCAR Xfinity Series began running there in 1999.

NASCAR announced that its championship weekend events would be run at Phoenix for 2020, marking the first time since NASCAR inaugurated the weekend that Homestead-Miami Speedway would not be the host track. The track also held the championship race for both the 2021 and 2022 NASCAR Cup Series seasons. Additionally, the track will hold the championship race for the 2023 NASCAR Cup Series season.

History
Phoenix International Raceway was built in 1964 around the Estrella Mountains on the outskirts of Avondale. Because of the terrain and the incorporation of a road course and drag strip, designers had to build a "dogleg" into the backstretch. The hillsides adjacent to the track also offer a unique vantage point to watch races from. "Monument Hill", located alongside turns 3 and 4 (now turns 1 and 2 due to the track's 2018 reconfiguration), is a favorite among race fans because of the unique view and lower ticket prices. At the top of this hill lies a USGS bench marker known as Gila and Salt River Meridian, now listed on the National Register of Historic Places. Long before Phoenix Raceway existed, this spot was the original land survey point for all of what later became the state of Arizona.

Phoenix International Raceway was built with the goal of being the western home of open wheel racing. Sports cars and USAC began racing at the track in 1964, and the track quickly became a favorite of drivers and soon replaced the old track at the Arizona State Fairgrounds. 

In 1973, the track was purchased by FasTrack International, Inc. and renamed FasTrack International Speedway. The name was reverted to Phoenix International Raceway in August 1976 when USAC team owner Bob Fletcher bought the speedway.

In 1977, the first Copper World Classic was held, a marque event for USAC midget and Silver Crown cars.

NASCAR began racing at Phoenix International Raceway in 1978.  

Then 1979 saw the inaugural CART race, the Arizona 150, which was won by Gordon Johncck driving a Penske PC6/78.

However, it was not until 1988 when NASCAR's premier series, now the NASCAR Cup Series, began racing at the track. Following the announcement of NASCAR being added to the track schedule, Phoenix International Raceway built a 3-story suite building outside of turn 1 and increased grandstand capacity to 30,000. A year prior, the track's main grandstand was struck by lightning and burned to the ground, reconstruction was finished in time for the first NASCAR cup race. That first race was won by Alan Kulwicki where in his celebration he performed the first "Polish Victory Lap".

In 1991, the old  road course was removed and replaced by a  infield road course. In 1996 the grandstand capacity was increased to 65,000. International Speedway Corporation (ISC) officially took ownership of Phoenix Raceway from Emmett "Buddy" Jobe in April 1997. Racing at Phoenix International Raceway began to dramatically change in 2003. Turn 2 was reconstructed by pushing back the outside wall to make racing safer. The wall originally came to an end where the old road course crossed the oval track. At the same time, an access tunnel was built under turn 4. Previously, vehicles had to use crossover gates and pedestrians used a crossover bridge. In 2004, NASCAR announced it would give a second annual race weekend to Phoenix International Raceway starting with the 2005 season. Following the announcement, the track installed lights to allow the newly scheduled NASCAR race to be run in the evening. The addition of a second NASCAR racing weekend had dramatic effects on the economy of the state of Arizona. A study at Arizona State University estimated that Phoenix International Raceway brings in nearly $473 million annually to the state. 2005 would also become the last year that a major open-wheel racing series would race at PIR, until it was recently announced that the track will return to the schedule for the 2016 IndyCar season. Despite the 2006 departure from the schedule, the track was still used by IndyCar for testing purposes.

In 2006, the Allison Grandstand was expanded from turn 1 to turn 2, increasing the reserved seating to 76,800. Included with the expansion is "Octane", an exclusive lounge on top of the grandstands overlooking turn 1. In 2008 Phoenix International Raceway added the SPEED Cantina, a one-of-a-kind at-track sports bar and grill, outside turn 2. In early 2010, some of the grandstands along the backstretch were removed to allow additional room for recreational vehicles, thus the seating capacity dropped to around 67,000.

On June 11, 2015, Phoenix International Raceway announced the track would be renamed to Jeff Gordon Raceway for the Quicken Loans Race for Heroes 500 in tribute to Gordon, who was contesting his last NASCAR season as a full-time driver in 2015.

On January 30, 2017, Phoenix International Raceway and ISC announced a $178 million renovation called the Phoenix Raceway Project Powered by DC Solar. The project was completed in October 2018, just in time for their November race weekend. It was also noted that the facility would be referred to as Phoenix Raceway moving forward, signaling the removal of International from the track's name.

New amenities after it was completed:

 Grandstand seating capacity will be 45,000.
 upgraded Club, 32 renovated suites and 19 new suites. 
 New escalators and elevators, in addition to the existing elevators that will be upgraded.
New souvenir areas, a new First Aid and EMS location, a new Guest Services area, as well as multiple new restrooms, including ADA restrooms.
 New Fanzone located in the infield.
 New DC solar fan midway.
 New Busch Garage, new Corporate Hospitality, and new Guest Services and Ticketing buildings.
 Technology upgrades planned for the Phoenix Raceway Project Powered by DC Solar include flat screen TVs throughout common areas, a new PA system and free Wi-Fi available throughout all common areas including the DC Solar Fan Midway, Infield and in-seat Wi-Fi.

Additional changes to the track after the project was completed:
 Removal of the former front stretch grandstands.
 Moving of the start / finish line to the area between the old turns 1/2 and the dogleg, thus flipping the turn numbering.
 Reconfiguration of pit road to include:
 Moving the pit entrance down the new backstretch (former front straightaway) and the exit to just past the new start / finish line.
 Extending pit road stalls around the new turn 4 (former turn 1) and to just past the new start / finish line.  The majority of the pit stalls will be on a curve and prior to the start / finish line.
 Tightening of the radius of pit road through the new turn 4 (former turn 1)

In September 2017, PIR formed a partnership with Ingenuity Sun Media (ISM Connect) to rename the track to ISM Raceway starting in 2018.
On June 22, 2018 IndyCar announced  it will not return to ISM in 2019 due to mediocre races and poor attendance.

On January 28, 2019, it was revealed on ISC's 2018 annual report that the raceway's track seating was reduced from 51,000 to 42,000.

On March 26, 2019 it was announced that starting in 2020, the track will become the host of the NASCAR championship weekend.

On January 3, 2020, the track mutually agreed to terminate the naming rights agreement with ISM Connect and its name reverted to Phoenix Raceway.

Movies and television
Phoenix was only mentioned in the episode Drive, Lady, Drive on the TV show CHiPs even though they used Riverside International Raceway as the stand in and racing footage from Ontario, Daytona and Atlanta were used.  Phoenix was also in the movie Days of Thunder starring Tom Cruise and Nicole Kidman.

Track renovation and length 

The raceway was originally constructed with a  road course that ran on both the inside and the outside of the main tri-oval. In 1991 the track was reconfigured with the  interior layout. Phoenix Raceway currently has an estimated grandstand seating capacity of around 51,000. Lights were installed around the track in 2004 following the addition of a second annual NASCAR race weekend.

In November 2010, ISC and the Avondale City Council announced plans for a $100 million long-term development for Phoenix International Raceway. $15 million would go towards repaving the track for the first time since 1990 and building a new media center. The plans also include a reconfiguration of the track. Along with the other changes, progressive banking was added to the turns: Turns 1 and 2, which had 11 degrees of banking, changed to 10 degrees on the bottom and 11 degrees on the top. Turns 3 and 4, which had 9 degrees of banking, changed to 8 degrees on the bottom and 9 on the top. Project leader Bill Braniff, Senior Director of Construction for North American Testing Corporation (NATC), a subsidiary of Phoenix International Raceway's parent company International Speedway Corporation, said "All of the changes – including the adjustment of the dog-leg – will be put in place in order to present additional opportunities for drivers to race side-by-side. We’re very confident that we’ll have multi-groove racing at Phoenix from Day 1 because of the variable banking that will be implemented.” The infield road course was also sealed off and removed from use, making Phoenix International Raceway an oval-only facility. The reconfiguration project was completed by mid-August 2011, and on August 29–30, five drivers tested the new track, describing the new dogleg and backstretch as a "rollercoaster" as now when they enter it dips, then rises on exit and dips down going into turn 3, due to the elevation changes. On October 4–5, several NASCAR Cup Series teams tested the oval which was open to the public. Over $7 million went towards connecting the track property to the Avondale water and sewer systems. Work began following the 2011 Subway Fresh Fit 500.
The reconfiguration in 2011 increased the banking slightly, removed the road course entirely and removed the grass and curbing inside of the dogleg, giving sanctioning bodies the option of whether or not to allow drivers to shortcut the dogleg and run on the now-paved apron that replaced the grass.

Renovations in 2018 reconfigured the pit road and infield areas, and moved the start/finish line to just coming out of what was turn 2 (now turn 4), before the dogleg.

The owner of the track and NASCAR specified the oval length as exactly one mile. That was the first IndyCar race after the renovation in 2011, in which the dogleg was extended outwards. In 2019 the oval track was rebuilt again and the start / finish line was relocated. The length of the oval was not changed. Before the renovation in 2011, the racetrack was also accepted by USAC, CART and IndyCar with a length of exactly one mile.

Lap Records
As of November 2020, the fastest official race lap records at Phoenix Raceway are listed as:

Racing events

Current events

 NASCAR Cup Series
United Rentals Work United 500 (Spring, 2005–present)
NASCAR Cup Series Championship Race (Fall, 1988–present)
 NASCAR Xfinity Series
United Rentals 200 (Spring, 2005–present)
NASCAR Xfinity Series Championship Race (Fall, 1999–present)
 NASCAR Camping World Truck Series
Lucas Oil 150 (1995–present)
 ARCA Menards Series
General Tire 150 (2020–present)

Previous events
 AMA Superbike Championship (1992–1993, 1997–1999)
 Atlantic Championship (1991–1995)
 Barber Pro Series (1992–1996, 2001)
 Can-Am (1987)
 CART
Slick-50 200 (1979, 1981–1982, 1984, 1986–1995)
Circle K/Fiesta Bowl 200 (1979–1986)
 Grand-Am Rolex Sports Car Series
The GAINSCO Grand Prix (2000–2006)
 IMSA GT Championship
Exxon World Sports Car Championships (1992–1995)
 IndyCar Series
Desert Diamond West Valley Phoenix Grand Prix (1996–2005, 2016–2018)
 Indy Lights
Phoenix Grand Prix (1986–1995, 2003–2005, 2016)
 NASCAR Craftsman Truck Series
GM Goodwrench / AC Delco 300 (1995–1998)
 ARCA Menards Series West
Casino Arizona 50 (1978–1984, 1988–1996, 2003–2004, 2010–2014)
Talking Stick Resort 75 (1998–2014)
 NASCAR Mexico Series
Toyota 120 (2013–2015)
 NASCAR Autozone Elite Division  Southwest (1988–2006)
 SCCA Formula Super Vee (1980–1990)
 Trans-Am Series (1995–1997)
 USAC IndyCar
Jimmy Bryan 150 (1964–1972, 1974–1978)
Bobby Ball 150 (1964–1978)
 USAC Honda National Midget Championship
Copper World Classic (1980–2009)
 USAC Stock Car (1968, 1970)
 USAC Mini-Indy Series (1977–1978)
 U.S. F2000 National Championship (1990, 1992, 1997–1999, 2003)

NASCAR Cup Series stats

Records
(As of 11/6/22)

* from minimum 5 starts.

Race winners
(*) Rain-shortened event
(**) Race extended due to green-white-checker finish
a April race extended to 375 laps (600 km)
b November 2011 races when track reconfigured to 1.022 miles

Track records

NOTE:  Calculations based on the 1.022 mile standard established in 2016 by INDYCAR.

See also
List of NASCAR tracks

References

External links

Official Site

PIR Page on NASCAR.com
RacewayReport.com: Phoenix International Raceway Page – Local area information, track specs, mapping, news and more.
Trackpedia guide to driving this track
High Resolution image from Google Maps

Avondale, Arizona
Champ Car circuits
IMSA GT Championship circuits
IndyCar Series tracks
Motorsport venues in Arizona
NASCAR races at Phoenix Raceway
NASCAR tracks
ARCA Menards Series tracks
Sports in Maricopa County, Arizona
Sports venues in Maricopa County, Arizona
1964 establishments in Arizona
Sports venues completed in 1964